

List of Ambassadors

Ran Gidor (Non-Resident, Yaounde) 2016 - 
Yoram Elron 2000 - 2003 
Yitzhak Michaeli 1970 - 1973
Aharon Ofri 1965 - 1968
Efraim Ben-Haim 1961 - 1963

References

Central African Republic
Israel